CGFC may refer to:

Caulfield Grammarians Football Club
(CGFC (art group) Icelandic performance art group founded 2015
Changsha Ginde F.C., now known as Guangzhou R&F F.C. 
Crawley Green F.C.